Ophonus azureus is a species of ground beetle in the subfamily Harpalinae, subgenus Ophonus (Hesperophonus). It is widespread in Europe and also present in North Africa and the Near East.

References

azureus
Beetles of Asia
Beetles of Europe
Beetles of North Africa
Beetles described in 1775
Taxa named by Johan Christian Fabricius